Global illumination (GI), or indirect illumination, is a group of algorithms used in 3D computer graphics that are meant to add more realistic lighting to 3D scenes. Such algorithms take into account not only the light that comes directly from a light source (direct illumination), but also subsequent cases in which light rays from the same source are reflected by other surfaces in the scene, whether reflective or not (indirect illumination).

Theoretically, reflections, refractions, and shadows are all examples of global illumination, because when simulating them, one object affects the rendering of another (as opposed to an object being affected only by a direct source of light). In practice, however, only the simulation of diffuse inter-reflection or caustics is called global illumination.

Algorithms
Images rendered using global illumination algorithms often appear more photorealistic than those using only direct illumination algorithms. However, such images are computationally more expensive and consequently much slower to generate. One common approach is to compute the global illumination of a scene and store that information with the geometry (e.g., radiosity). The stored data can then be used to generate images from different viewpoints for generating walkthroughs of a scene without having to go through expensive lighting calculations repeatedly.

Radiosity, ray tracing, beam tracing, cone tracing, path tracing, volumetric path tracing, Metropolis light transport, ambient occlusion, photon mapping, signed distance field and image-based lighting are all examples of algorithms used in global illumination, some of which may be used together to yield results that are not fast, but accurate.

These algorithms model diffuse inter-reflection which is a very important part of global illumination; however most of these (excluding radiosity) also model specular reflection, which makes them more accurate algorithms to solve the lighting equation and provide a more realistically illuminated scene.  The algorithms used to calculate the distribution of light energy between surfaces of a scene are closely related to heat transfer simulations performed using finite-element methods in engineering design.

Photorealism

Achieving accurate computation of global illumination in real-time remains difficult.  In real-time 3D graphics, the diffuse inter-reflection component of global illumination is sometimes approximated by an "ambient" term in the lighting equation, which is also called "ambient lighting" or "ambient color" in 3D software packages. Though this method of approximation (also known as a "cheat" because it's not really a global illumination method) is easy to perform computationally, when used alone it does not provide an adequately realistic effect. Ambient lighting is known to "flatten" shadows in 3D scenes, making the overall visual effect more bland. However, used properly, ambient lighting can be an efficient way to make up for a lack of processing power.

Procedure
More and more specialized algorithms are used in 3D programs that can effectively simulate the global illumination. These algorithms are numerical approximations to the rendering equation. Well known algorithms for computing global illumination include path tracing, photon mapping and radiosity.
The following approaches can be distinguished here:
 Inversion: 
 is not applied in practice
 Expansion: 
 bi-directional approach: Photon mapping + Distributed ray tracing, Bi-directional path tracing, Metropolis light transport
 Iteration: 
 Radiosity
In Light-path notation global lighting the paths of the type L (D | S) corresponds * E.

A full treatment can be found in

Image-based lighting
Another way to simulate real global illumination is the use of high-dynamic-range images (HDRIs), also known as environment maps, which encircle and illuminate the scene. This process is known as image-based lighting.

List of methods

See also

:Category:Global illumination software
Bias of an estimator
Bidirectional scattering distribution function
Consistent estimator
Unbiased rendering

References

External links
Video demonstrating global illumination and the ambient color effect
Real-time GI demos – survey of practical real-time GI techniques as a list of executable demos
kuleuven - This page contains the Global Illumination Compendium, an effort to bring together most of the useful formulas and equations for global illumination algorithms in computer graphics.
Theory and practical implementation of Global Illumination using Monte Carlo Path Tracing.

Global illumination algorithms